Valerie Hans is the Charles F. Rechlin Professor of Law at Cornell Law School and the editor of the Annual Review of Law and Social Science. Trained as a social scientist, her major areas of study are the jury system, jury reform, and the application of social science to law.

Career
Hans' area of study is on the jury system, conducting social science-based empirical studies on legal decision making, particularly focusing on jury decisions.  She has authored or edited seven books and written scholarly publications that are listed among the highest rated in terms of scholarly impact.

Hans serves as a co-editor for the Journal of Empirical Legal Studies and was the president of the  Law and Society Association for a two-year term beginning in June 2015. She was awarded the group's Stan Wheeler Mentorship Award in 2012.

Hans has appeared as a commentator in news publications and programs on the jury system and juror behavior during prominent public trials such as the Boston Marathon bombing trial of Dzhokhar Tsarnaev, and other prominent cases.

Publications

Selected books authored or edited

Selected publications

References

External links
 Cornell Law School Faculty Profile

Cornell Law School faculty
Living people
Year of birth missing (living people)
Annual Reviews (publisher) editors